DeLoris Doederlein (born October 6, 1925) is an American educator and politician.

Doederlein graduated from Valparaiso University and National Louis University. She taught school and lives in East Dundee, Illinois with her husband and family. Doedelein served in the Illinois House of Representatives, from 1987 to 1993 and was involved with the Republican Party.

Notes

1925 births
Living people
People from Kane County, Illinois
Valparaiso University alumni
National Louis University alumni
Educators from Illinois
American women educators
Women state legislators in Illinois
Republican Party members of the Illinois House of Representatives
20th-century American politicians
20th-century American women politicians
21st-century American women